Boško Dopuđ (born 9 December 1990) is a Serbian football who plays as a centre-back for Italia Serie D club Francavilla.

References

External links
 
 Boško Dopuđ stats at utakmica.rs
 Boško Dopuđ at TuttoCampo

1990 births
Living people
Serbian footballers
Serbian expatriate footballers
Sportspeople from Zadar
Association football defenders
Serbs of Croatia
FK Mornar players
FK Metalac Gornji Milanovac players
FK BSK Borča players
CMS Oissel players
F.C. Francavilla players
Serbian SuperLiga players
Montenegrin First League players
Serie D players
Serbian expatriate sportspeople in Montenegro
Serbian expatriate sportspeople in France
Serbian expatriate sportspeople in Italy
Expatriate footballers in Montenegro
Expatriate footballers in France
Expatriate footballers in Italy